Antonio Pesenti may refer to:
 Antonio Pesenti (cyclist)
 Antonio Pesenti (economist)